The Turkey national under-20 football team is the national under-20 football team of Turkey and is controlled by the Turkish Football Federation. The team competes in the FIFA U-20 World Cup, which is held every two years. To qualify for this tournament (which is held in odd years), the team must finish in the top six of the UEFA European Under-19 Football Championship from the previous year (unless acting as host).

Competitive record

FIFA World Youth Championship/U-20 World Cup Record

*Red border colour indicates tournament was held on home soil.

UEFA European Under-19 Championship
UEFA European Under-19 Championship

2023 UEFA European Under-19 Championship

Mediterranean Games
Turkey B 

Overall record as of September 29, 2013: 28 matches played, 13 wins, 10 draws, 5 losses.

Toulon Tournament
 2003 Toulon Tournament
 2008 Toulon Tournament
 2012 Toulon Tournament
 2018 Toulon Tournament

Under-20 Four Nations Tournament
 2014 Under-20 Four Nations Tournament

1993 FIFA World Youth Championship

Group C

2005 FIFA World Youth Championship

Group B

Round of 16

Current squad

Past squads

FIFA World Youth Championship/U-20 World Cup squads
 1993 FIFA World Youth Championship
 2005 FIFA World Youth Championship
 2013 FIFA U-20 World Cup

See also
Under 20 Elite League

 Turkey national football team
Turkey national under-21 football team
 Turkey national under-20 football team
 Turkey national under-19 football team
 Turkey national under-17 football team
 Turkey national youth football team

References

under
European national under-20 association football teams